Tanganikallabes mortiauxi is a species of airbreathing catfish found in Burundi, the Democratic Republic of the Congo, Tanzania, and Zambia. This species grows to about 33.0 centimetres (13.0 in) TL. It is found among stones on rocky shores of lakes.

References

Tanganikallabes
Catfish of Africa
Fish of Burundi
Fish of the Democratic Republic of the Congo
Fish of Tanzania
Fish of Zambia
Fish of Lake Tanganyika
Fish described in 1943
Taxa named by Max Poll
Taxonomy articles created by Polbot